Brestskiy Kurier (translated as Brest Courier) is a weekly Belarusian newspaper founded in 1913 under the name Brest-Litovskiy Kurier, and re-founded in 1990 as Brestskiy Kurier. The paper is distributed in  Brest and Brest Region.

History 
Brestskiy Kurier dates back to 1906 when it was distributed under the name Brest-Litovskiy Kurier. In this form the paper had existed until 1915 when Brest-Litovsk was occupied by the German troops during the World War I. Brest-Litovskiy Kurier was being issued daily, twice: in the morning and in the evening. Notably, such high circulation was achieved in a city with the population of 50 thousand.

The first issue of the reestablished Brestskiy Kurier came out in June 1990 and was printed in Vilnius.

In 1999 the newspaper received an award in the category The Young Press of Eastern Europe by the ZEIT-Stiftung foundation.

Format 
Brestskiy Kurier comes out weekly on Wednesdays. It is usually 32 pages long.

Content 

Brestskiy Kurier covers all the main regional events and publishes the news, editorials, investigative reporting, analytical reviews, letters to the editor, as well as sections on culture, sports and crime.

References 
This article incorporates information from the equivalent article on the Russian Wikipedia (version of April 2012).

Literature

External links 
 Official website

Weekly newspapers
Russian-language newspapers published in Belarus
Mass media in Brest, Belarus
Free Media Awards winners